Laurie Graham (born 25 November 1947 in Leicester, England) is a journalist, radio scriptwriter and novelist. She lives in London.

Career 
Graham is an occasional contributor to The Spectator. She wrote a weekly column for The Daily Telegraph and the Sunday Telegraph newspapers from 1987 to 1991. She was also Contributing Editor to She magazine and Cosmopolitan. Graham has written twenty two novels and several volumes of non-fiction. Graham is published by Quercus in the United Kingdom.

Bibliography

Fiction

The Importance of Being Kennedy (2007) 
Gone With The Windsors (2005) 
Mr Starlight (2004) 
The Unfortunates (2002)  published in the US as The Great Husband Hunt 
The Future Homemakers of America (2001) 
Dog Days, Glenn Miller Nights (2000) 
The Dress Circle (1998) 
Perfect Meringues (1997) 
The Ten O’Clock Horses (1996) 
The Man for the Job (1986) 
Life according to Lubka (2010) 
At Sea (2010)  (1 July 2010)
A Humble Companion (2012) 
The Liar's Daughter (2013) 
The Grand Duchess of Nowhere (2014) 
The Night in Question (2015) 
The Early Birds (2017) 
Anyone for Seconds? (2019)  
Dr Dan's Casebook (2019)  
Dr Dan, Married Man (2020) 
Dr Dan Moves On (2020) 
Dr Dan, Dr Dad (2021)

Non-Fiction

Teenagers: A Family Survival Guide (1992) 
Getting It Right: A Survival Guide to Modern Manners (1989) 
A Marriage Survival Guide (1988) 
A Parents’ Survival Guide (1986)

References

1947 births
Living people
People from Leicester
English women novelists
English non-fiction writers
English columnists
British women columnists
English women non-fiction writers